The 1920 Michigan State Normal Normalites football team represented Michigan State Normal College (later renamed Eastern Michigan University) during the 1920 college football season.  In their third non-consecutive season under head coach Elton Rynearson, the Normalites compiled a record of 6–2 (1–2 against Michigan Intercollegiate Athletic Association opponents) and outscored all opponents by a combined total of 132 to 86. William Hansor was the team captain.

Schedule

References

Michigan State Normal
Eastern Michigan Eagles football seasons
Michigan State Normal Normalites football